Alexander McKay or MacKay may refer to:

People
 Alexander McKay (boxer) (1804–1830), Scottish heavyweight bare-knuckle fighter
 Alexander McKay (politician) (1843–1912), mayor of Hamilton, Ontario, 1886–1887
 Alexander Mackay (British Army officer) (1717–1789), British general and Member of Parliament
 Alexander MacKay (politician) (1818–?), merchant and politician in Nova Scotia, Canada
 Alexander Gordon McKay (1924–2007), Canadian academic who specialized in Vergilian studies
 Alexander Murdoch Mackay (1849–1890), Presbyterian missionary to Uganda
 Alexander MacKay (fur trader) (1770–1811), business associate of fur trader Duncan Cameron
 Alexander Grant MacKay (1860–1920), Canadian teacher, lawyer and provincial level politician
 Alexander Mackay (magistrate) (1833–1909), New Zealand farmer, explorer, linguist, magistrate and land court judge
 Alexander McLellan Mackay (1834–1905), businessman and politician in Newfoundland
 Alexander McKay (geologist) (1841–1917), New Zealand geologist
 Alexander McKay (educator) (1841–1917), educator in Nova Scotia

Fictional characters
 Alex MacKay, a fictional 1632 character